Anthony Eric Hancock (born 31 January 1967) is an English retired professional association footballer who played as a striker.

Playing career
He started his career with Stockport Georgians. He then played in the English Football League for Stockport County and Burnley, was at Preston North End and then moved into non-league football with Northwich Victoria.

He then had brief spells playing football in  Finland and Australia before playing with Caernarfon Town and Hyde United, although the latter is contradicted by www.hydeunited.com, the club's own historical database.

He joined Mossley from Woodley Sports, playing eight games and scoring one goal before transferring back to Woodley Sports.

Management career
He was later player/ manager of Abbey Hey, Woodley Sports and New Mills.  Whilst at New Mills he continued to play.

References

1967 births
Living people
Footballers from Manchester
English footballers
Association football forwards
Stockport County F.C. players
Burnley F.C. players
Preston North End F.C. players
English Football League players
Mossley A.F.C. players
Stockport Sports F.C. players
English football managers
New Mills A.F.C. managers
Northwich Victoria F.C. players
Caernarfon Town F.C. players
Hyde United F.C. players
New Mills A.F.C. players
Abbey Hey F.C. players